Ribeira de Nisa e Carreiras is a civil parish in the municipality of Portalegre, Portugal. It was formed in 2013 by the merger of the former parishes Ribeira de Nisa and Carreiras. The population in 2011 was 1,949, in an area of 50.43 km2.

References

Freguesias of Portalegre, Portugal